For fixed-wing aircraft, ground effect is the reduced aerodynamic drag that an aircraft's wings generate when they are close to a fixed surface. Reduced drag when in ground effect during takeoff can cause the aircraft to "float" while below the recommended climb speed. The pilot can then fly just above the runway while the aircraft accelerates in ground effect until a safe climb speed is reached.

For rotorcraft, ground effect results in less drag on the rotor during hovering close to the ground. At high weights this sometimes allows the rotorcraft to lift off while stationary in ground effect but does not allow it to transition to flight out of ground effect. Helicopter pilots are provided with performance charts which show the limitations for hovering their helicopter in ground effect (IGE) and out of ground effect (OGE). The charts show the added lift benefit produced by ground effect.

For fan- and jet-powered vertical take-off and landing (VTOL) aircraft, ground effect when hovering can cause suckdown and fountain lift on the airframe and loss in hovering thrust if the engine sucks in its own exhaust gas, which is known as hot gas ingestion (HGI).

Explanations

Fixed wing aircraft

When an aircraft flies at or below approximately half the length of the aircraft's wingspan above the ground or water there occurs an often-noticeable ground effect. The result is lower induced drag on the aircraft. This is caused primarily by the ground or water obstructing the creation of wingtip vortices and interrupting downwash behind the wing.

A wing generates lift by deflecting the oncoming airmass (relative wind) downward. The deflected or "turned" flow of air creates a resultant force on the wing in the opposite direction (Newton's 3rd law). The resultant force is identified as lift. Flying close to a surface increases air pressure on the lower wing surface, nicknamed the "ram" or "cushion" effect, and thereby improves the aircraft lift-to-drag ratio. The lower/nearer the wing is with regards to the ground, the more pronounced the ground effect becomes. While in the ground effect, the wing requires a lower angle of attack to produce the same amount of lift. In wind tunnel tests in which the angle of attack and airspeed remain constant, an increase in the lift coefficient ensues, which accounts for the "floating" effect. Ground effect also alters thrust versus velocity, where reduced induced drag requires less thrust in order to maintain the same velocity.

Low winged aircraft are more affected by ground effect than high wing aircraft. Due to the change in up-wash, down-wash, and wingtip vortices there may be errors in the airspeed system while in ground effect due to changes in the local pressure at the static source.

Rotorcraft
When a hovering rotor is near the ground the downward flow of air through the rotor is reduced to zero at the ground. This condition is transferred up to the disc through pressure changes in the wake which decreases the inflow to the rotor for a given disc loading, which is rotor thrust for each square foot of its area. This gives a thrust increase for a particular blade pitch angle, or, alternatively, the power required for a thrust is reduced. For an overloaded helicopter that can only hover IGE it may be possible to climb away from the ground by translating to forward flight first while in ground effect. The ground effect benefit disappears rapidly with speed but the induced power decreases rapidly as well to allow a safe climb. Some early underpowered helicopters could only hover close to the ground. Ground effect is at its maximum over a firm, smooth surface.

VTOL aircraft
There are two effects inherent to VTOL aircraft operating at zero and low speeds in ground effect, suckdown and fountain lift. A third, hot gas ingestion, may also apply to fixed-wing aircraft on the ground in windy conditions or during thrust reverser operation. How well, in terms of weight lifted, a VTOL aircraft hovers IGE depends on suckdown on the air frame, fountain impingement on the underside of the fuselage and HGI into the engine causing inlet temperature rise (ITR). Suckdown works against the engine lift as a downward force on the airframe. Fountain flow works with the engine lift jets as an upwards force. The severity of the HGI problem becomes clear when the level of ITR is converted into engine thrust loss, three to four percent per 10 °F inlet temperature rise.

Suckdown is the result of entrainment of air around aircraft by lift jets when hovering. It also occurs in free air (OGE) causing loss of lift by reducing pressures on the underside of the fuselage and wings. Enhanced entrainment occurs when close to the ground giving higher lift loss. Fountain lift occurs when an aircraft has two or more lift jets. The jets strike the ground and spread out. Where they meet under the fuselage they mix and can only move upwards striking the underside of the fuselage.  How well their upward momentum is diverted sideways or downward determines the lift. Fountain flow follows a curved fuselage underbody and retains some momentum in an upward direction so less than full fountain lift is captured unless lift improvement devices are fitted. HGI reduces engine thrust because the air entering the engine is hotter and less dense than cold air.

Early VTOL experimental aircraft operated from open grids to channel away the engine exhaust and prevent thrust loss from HGI.

The Bell X-14, built to research early VTOL technology, was unable to hover until suckdown effects were reduced by raising the aircraft with longer landing gear legs. It also had to operate from an elevated platform of perforated steel to reduce HGI. The Dassault Mirage IIIV VTOL research aircraft only ever operated vertically from a grid which allowed engine exhaust to be channeled away from the aircraft to avoid suckdown and HGI effects.

Ventral strakes retroactively fitted to the P.1127 improved flow and increased pressure under the belly in low altitude hovering. Gun pods fitted in the same position on the production Harrier GR.1/GR.3 and the AV-8A Harrier did the same thing. Further lift improvement devices (LIDS) were developed for the AV-8B and Harrier II. To box in the belly region where the lift-enhancing fountains strike the aircraft, strakes were added to the underside of the gun pods and a hinged dam could be lowered to block the gap between the front ends of the strakes. This gave a 1200 lb lift gain.

Lockheed Martin F-35 Lightning II weapons-bay inboard doors on the F-35B open to capture fountain flow created by the engine and fan lift jets and counter suckdown IGE.

Wing stall in ground effect

The stalling angle of attack is less in ground effect, by approximately 2–4 degrees, than in free air. When the flow separates there is a large increase in drag. If the aircraft overrotates on take-off at too low a speed the increased drag can prevent the aircraft from leaving the ground. Two de Havilland Comets overran the end of the runway after overrotating. Loss of control may occur if one wing tip stalls in ground effect. During certification testing of the Gulfstream G650 business jet the test aircraft rotated to an angle beyond the predicted IGE stalling angle. The over-rotation caused one wing-tip to stall and an uncommanded roll, which overpowered the lateral controls, led to loss of the aircraft.

Ground-effect vehicle

A few vehicles have been designed to explore the performance advantages of flying in ground effect, mainly over water. The operational disadvantages of flying very close to the surface have discouraged widespread applications.

See also
 Coandă effect
 Ground effect (cars)
 Hovercraft
 Vortex ring

References

Notes

Bibliography

 
 
 Pilot's Encyclopedia of Aeronautical Knowledge (Federal Aviation Administration). New York: Skyhorse Publishing, 2007. .

External links

 Engineering explanation. SE-Technology ('dead' site)
 Ask Us – Ground Effect and WIG Vehicles. Aerospaceweb.org
  DSTO-GD-0201. Sponsored by DSTO Aeronautical and Maritime Research Laboratory, Australian Government. (WebArchive)
 Wing in Ground Effect and helicopters. dynamicflight.com
 Plane Can Fly Inches Over Water Tongji University Scientists in Shanghai announce design of a new vehicle, inventorspot.com, 14 July 2007
 Ground-effect gliding. hanggliding.org
 Numerical Analysis of Airfoil in Ground Proximity Journal of Theoretical and Applied Mechanics, 45, 2, pp. 425–36, Warsaw 2007. ptmts.org. PDF-715 KB

Aerodynamics
Articles containing video clips